Sanele Mathenjwa (born 5 October 1995) is a South African soccer player who last played as a midfielder for South African side Black Leopards. He was born in KwaMashu.

References

1995 births
Living people
People from KwaMashu
Soccer players from KwaZulu-Natal
South African soccer players
Association football midfielders
Lamontville Golden Arrows F.C. players
Black Leopards F.C. players
South African Premier Division players